George Strickler (August 12, 1904 – December 8, 1976) was an American sports writer.

Career
Strickler began his career as a student publicity man for Notre Dame University. He is credited with coining the term "Four Horsemen for the 1924 Fighting Irish backfield. In the late 1940s he was the assistant general manager and publicity director for the Green Bay Packers.

He served as the first President of the Pro Football Writers of America from 1964-65.

References

American sportswriters
1904 births
1976 deaths